The 2016/17 season of the Algerian Women's Volleyball League  was the 55th annual season of the country's highest volleyball level.

Members of the Algerian Women's Volleyball League (2016–17 season)

Regular season

|}

References

External links
 Algerian Women's Volleyball League 2016/2017
 Volleyball in Algeria

Volleyball competitions in Algeria
2017 in women's volleyball
2016 in women's volleyball
2017 in Algerian sport
2016 in Algerian sport